Teres may refer to:

Anatomy:
Teres major muscle, a muscle of the upper limb; one of seven scapulohumeral muscles
Teres minor muscle, a narrow, elongated muscle of the rotator cuff
Pronator teres muscle, a muscle located mainly in the human forearm
Pronator teres syndrome, a compression neuropathy of the median nerve at the elbow
Ligamentum teres (disambiguation)

Odrysian rulers:
Teres I, the first king of the Odrysian state of Thrace (reigned 475-445 BC)
Teres II, king of the Odrysians in middle Thrace from 351 BC to 342 BC, succeeding his father, Amatokos II
Teres III, king of the Odrysians in Thrace in ca. 149 BC, the son of Cotys IV

Geography:
Teres Ridge, a ridge of elevation 330 m near Siddins Point on the Hero Bay coast of Livingston Island, Antarctica

Given name:
Teres Lindberg (born 1974), Swedish politician
Teres Shulkowsky (born 1989), an Israeli football defender currently playing for the Maccabi Netanya football club

Family name:
Joan Terès i Borrull (1538-1603), Spanish archbishop and viceroy of Catalonia

Species name in binomial nomenclature:
Acianthera teres, a species of orchid
Blasicrura teres, a species of sea snail
Bulbophyllum teres, a species of orchid
Diodia teres, a species of flowering plant in the coffee family
Drechslera teres f. maculata, a plant pathogen
Elimia teres, a species of freshwater snail
Gonospira teres, a species of air-breathing land snail
Perilla teres, a species of spider
Pyrenophora teres, a necrotrophic fungal pathogen
Pyrenophora teres f. maculata, a plant pathogen
Pyrenophora teres f. teres, a plant pathogen
Teretia teres, a species of sea snail
Trombidium teres, a species of mite
Xymene teres, a species of predatory sea snail

sh:Teres